

1810 Atlantic hurricane season
I.  On July 30 and July 31, this tropical storm affected Jamaica.

II.  On August 12 a hurricane hit Trinidad, causing heavy damage.  The system apparently moved to Jamaica by the 15th.

III.  A tropical storm hit near Charleston, South Carolina between September 11 and September 13, causing minor damage.

IV.  A tropical cyclone strikes eastern Cuba on September 28.

V.  The "Salty Storm" strikes Cuba on October 24 and 25th before continuing onward into the southwest Atlantic.  The pressure at Havana falls to 29.35 in Hg (994 hPa).

1811 Atlantic hurricane season
I. Macapá, a city in Brazil on the mouth of the Amazon River, on June 7, 1811, saw an intense hurricane with damage to the city being minor as a localized weather event kept the damage to Portuguese military installations.

II.  A minor hurricane that struck Cuba continued onward to Charleston, South Carolina on September 10, causing many deaths, tornadoes, and crop damage as it moved across the state.

III.  On October 4 a major hurricane hit near St. Augustine, Florida. Many homes were destroyed, and 35 people drowned in the sinking of a U.S. gunboat.

IV. On October 11 a hurricane strikes Pensacola, Florida and Fort Stoddard, Alabama.

V.  A hurricane moved through the western Caribbean west of Jamaica to Cuba between October 20 and October 25.  On October 26 a Spanish ship is lost at Elliot Key from a hurricane.

1812 Atlantic hurricane season
I.  Between June 5 and June 11, a tropical storm moved through the northwest Caribbean Sea.

II.  A tropical cyclone struck Puerto Rico on July 23.

III.  On August 8, a tropical storm moved into South Carolina.

Great Louisiana hurricane

IV.  A tropical cyclone was sighted east of Jamaica on August 14.  By August 19, it struck southeast Louisiana as a major hurricane after raking the Caribbean Islands. It passed just to the west of New Orleans, almost destroying the levee north of town. The hurricane caused severe flooding, damaged 53 boats, caused $6,000,000 in damage, and 100 deaths. The British fleet in the War of 1812 was disrupted.

V.  There is record of another hurricane affecting Puerto Rico on August 21.

VI.  Later in the season, a hurricane hit Jamaica on October 12, affecting the island into the 14th. It continued northwestward and struck Grand Cayman shortly afterwards. Later that day, the hurricane hit Cuba before moving into the southwest Atlantic east of Bermuda by October 17. It destroyed 500 houses and many ships.

1813 Atlantic hurricane season
I.  On 22 July, a hurricane hit Barbados, killing 18.  It continued through the Antilles, affecting Puerto Rico on the 23 July, causing more damage and deaths along its path.  A major hurricane, probably this same storm, struck the Bahamas on 26 July and recurved west of Bermuda by 29 July.

II.  A storm moved through the Leeward Islands on 29 July and then struck Jamaica on 31 July/1 August, leading to many lives lost.  The hurricane moved into Belize on 3 August.

III. A tropical cyclone on 3–7 August passed near Bermuda, with the severest weather occurring on 4/5 August.  It ranks the most powerful hurricane to affect the island since 1793 and forced the construction of a breakwater to prevent a similar harbor disaster from recurring; the "violent gale" drove ashore more than 30 ships.  Winds were estimated at  during the passage of the cyclone.

IV.  A powerful hurricane hit Dominica and Martinique beginning 25 August, causing 3000 deaths.  The hurricane moved south of Jamaica, bringing wind to the island on 28 August.

V.  A system affected the Caicos Islands on 24 August and moved northwest as a compact major hurricane to strike near Charleston, South Carolina on 27 August, causing many deaths due to drowning.  The storm passed northward through the Mid-Atlantic States by 29 August.

VI.  A major hurricane hit northeast Florida or southeast Georgia on 16 September, causing strong storm surge and 50 casualties.

1814 Atlantic hurricane season
I.  A minimal hurricane hit South Carolina on July 1, causing 1 tornado.

II.  A hurricane struck Dominica and Puerto Rico between July 22 and July 24.

III.  A hurricane affected Bermuda for four days around October 10.  (from Beware the Hurricane) {USS Wasp (1814)Probably lost in storm}

1815 Atlantic hurricane season
I. A hurricane was reported on August 9 in the Gulf Stream offshore of the Mid-Atlantic / New England states at latitude 40, longitude -60. It is suspected that  (as the renamed USS Epervier) foundered in the storm, on its return voyage from the Mediterranean with news of the United States Naval victory over the Dey of Algiers in the Second Barbary War.

II.  A tropical cyclone impacted Puerto Rico on August 30.

III.  Cape Lookout, North Carolina was hit by a major hurricane on September 3. It moved northeastward across the state, reaching the Atlantic Ocean near Maryland. It weakened over land to a tropical storm, but still brought gusty winds to New England. It caused at least 4 deaths.

IV.  A tropical cyclone struck Puerto Rico on September 15.

V.  A major hurricane was located off the coast of Virginia moving northward. It hit Long Island, New York on September 23, causing damage and destruction throughout New England. At least 20 deaths occurred, though "The loss of life was so heavy that the newspapers did not have space enough to give all the details of the marine disasters."

VI.  A tropical storm was located off the coast of South Carolina on September 28, but did not make landfall.

VII.  From October 17 until October 19 Jamaica was hit by a hurricane. It drifted over the island, causing 100 deaths.

VIII.  A minor hurricane hit Saint Barthélemy on October 18. It turned northwestward, and moved up the Chesapeake Bay on October 24, delaying ships' arrivals.

1816 Atlantic hurricane season

Records from ship logs have determined both 1815 and 1816 were active hurricane seasons, with at least 12 tropical cyclones ascribed to 1816 alone.  This is some evidence that a northward-displaced Intertropical Convergence Zone appears to be partially responsible for the increased tropical cyclone activity in 1816, which was the famed Year Without a Summer.

I.  June 5–8:  A hurricane brushed the Florida Keys, causing the loss of five ships.  It appears to have been lured northward by an unusual June snowstorm across New England.

II.  Haiti, around Port-au-Prince, was struck by a hurricane on August 18.

III.  Martinique, eastern Cuba, and South Carolina were lashed by a hurricane between September 3 and September 11.

IV.  A tropical storm affected Virginia on September 18 before moving northeast into New York. The tropical storm caused heavy flooding in the James River area.

V.  There is record of a hurricane moving by Dominica and Barbados on September 15  before devastating Puerto Rico  on September 18.  The cyclone then recurved between the United States East coast and Bermuda by September 25.

VI.  On October 16–17, a severe gale was experienced in Dominica and Martinique.  During the storm, an earthquake shook the region.

1817 Atlantic hurricane season
I.  A hurricane was first observed near Tobago on August 1 before continuing through the Caribbean Sea and the Gulf of Mexico by August 6. It crossed over Florida, and when it reached the western Atlantic, it paralleled the coastlines of Georgia and South Carolina. It moved inland over southern North Carolina, and brought heavy rain to the Norfolk, Virginia area, delaying mail delivery and causing flooding through the mid-Atlantic as it moved northward into Pennsylvania by August 9.  Its track appears similar to that of Hurricane Charley of August 2004.

II.  Barbados and Saint Lucia were struck by a hurricane on October 21, causing 250 deaths as it moved through the Lesser Antilles.  The hurricane subsequently moved into Nicaragua by October 26.

1818 Atlantic hurricane season
I.  A hurricane passed through the central Atlantic east of Bermuda to south and east of the Azores between August 26 and September 5.  It reportedly silted at Hamilton Harbor on Bermuda. (from Beware the Hurricane)

II.  A hurricane passed by the Cayman Islands in early September. It crossed the Yucatán Peninsula, and turned northwest when it reached the Bay of Campeche. The hurricane intensified to a Category 2–3 before hitting Galveston, Texas on September 12 and continuing onward to Mississippi. The hurricane was "quite severe", destroying all but six houses on Galveston Island.

III. A tropical cyclone seriously affected Puerto Rico on 22 September. It possibly recurved sharply offshore the Eastern Seaboard; the frigate Macedonian encountered a hurricane on 26/27 September east-northeast of Bermuda. The breeze freshened that afternoon as the ship lay near 35.6N 55.7W. One man fell overboard by 5 pm and drowned. The hurricane reached its full violence by 10 pm, splitting the storm staysails and making the rigging useless. The main mast cracked under the strain by 2 am on the 28 September, and the mizzenmast followed suit by 4 am. Seawater poured into the ship from all sides, as the wooden hull twisted under the force of the  waves. The ship finally cleared the storm without capsizing by noon, and her crew again saw sunset on the evening of 29 September.

IV.  A hurricane on 12–14 October affected Jamaica and the central Bahamas.

V.  Between November 6 and November 13, another hurricane moved across the southwest Caribbean Sea into Jamaica and Cuba.  A hurricane struck Jamaica on 18–20 November.

1819 Atlantic hurricane season

Bay St. Louis Hurricane
The exact origin of this hurricane is unknown, but it likely formed off the coast of Cuba before heading on a west-northwest track towards the Gulf Coast. A small hurricane, it reached an estimated Category 3–4 strength before making landfall on July 27 in southeastern Louisiana, bringing heavy winds and a 5–6 ft storm surge. The hurricane continued northeastward, making a second landfall in Bay St. Louis, Mississippi before dissipating inland. Known as one of the most destructive hurricanes to affect the United States during the first half of the 19th century, the Bay St. Louis Hurricane caused severe damage across Alabama, Louisiana, and Mississippi, leaving behind the remains of shattered buildings and uprooted trees. Several vessels (from small boats to 60-ton brigs) were driven ashore by the hurricane's storm surge. One of them was the capsizing of the U.S. warship USS Firebrand, drowning 39 sailors. Several U.S. soldiers were caught off guard by the hurricane and perished in its midst. There were also reports of people being attacked by alligators, snapping turtles, and snakes, which further added to the death toll. The hurricane caused over $100,000 dollars (1819 US dollars) in damage, and killed between 43 and 175 people, some of them later found washed up across the Gulf Coast.

Hurricane San Mateo
Between September 19 and September 26, hurricane San Mateo tracked through the northeast Lesser Antilles and southwest of Bermuda.  During September 21 and September 22, this hurricane hit the Virgin Islands and Puerto Rico, causing heavy damage and loss of life.  In Saint Tomas about 101 ships were sunk.  In Puerto Rico it destroyed most of the houses in the towns and most of the crops in the fields.

Other systems
 A tropical storm hit between New Orleans and Apalachicola in September.
 From October 13 to October 15, a hurricane passed through the Leeward Islands.
 A hurricane is recorded to have struck Cuba on October 27 before moving onward to the Bahamas on October 28.

In the aftermath of the 1815 Great Gale, the concept of a hurricane as a "moving vortex" was presented by John Farrar, Hollis Professor of Mathematics and Natural Philosophy at Harvard University in an 1819 paper. He was the first known to conclude that a hurricane "appears to have been a moving vortex and not the rushing forward of a great body of the atmosphere".

See also 

List of tropical cyclones
Atlantic hurricane season

References

World wide web

Books
David Longshore. "Bay St. Louis Hurricane." Encyclopedia of Hurricanes, Typhoons and Cyclones. David Longshore. New York: Facts on File, 1998, p. 33–34.
Terry Tucker. Beware the Hurricane!  The Story of the Gyratory Tropical Storms That Have Struck Bermuda.  Bermuda:  Hamilton Press, 1966, p. 77–87.

External links
 http://www.treasurelore.com/florida/hurricanes.htm
 https://web.archive.org/web/20091212091250/http://www.sephardim.org/jamaica/main.html
 http://www.nhc.noaa.gov/pastdeadly.shtml
 http://myweb.fsu.edu/jelsner/temp/HHITProject/HHITyears/
 http://www.candoo.com/genresources/hurricane.htm

 
1810s